A systematic element name is the  temporary name assigned to an unknown or recently synthesized chemical element. A systematic symbol is also derived from this name.

In chemistry, a transuranic element receives a permanent name and symbol only after its synthesis has been confirmed. In some cases, such as the Transfermium Wars, controversies over the formal name and symbol have been protracted and highly political. In order to discuss such elements without ambiguity, the International Union of Pure and Applied Chemistry (IUPAC) uses a set of rules, adopted in 1978, to assign a temporary systematic name and symbol to each such element. This approach to naming originated in the successful development of regular rules for the naming of organic compounds.

IUPAC rules 
The temporary names derive systematically from the element's atomic number, and apply only to 101 ≤ Z ≤ 999. Each digit is translated into a "numerical root" according to the table. The roots are concatenated, and the name is completed by the suffix -ium. Some of the roots are Latin and others are Greek, to avoid two digits starting with the same letter (for example, the Greek-derived pent is used instead of the Latin-derived quint to avoid confusion with quad for 4). There are two elision rules designed to prevent odd-looking names.

Traditionally the suffix -ium was used only for metals (or at least elements that were expected to be metallic), and other elements used different suffixes: halogens used -ine and noble gases used -on instead. However, the systematic names use -ium for all elements regardless of group. Thus, elements 117 and 118 were ununseptium and ununoctium, not ununseptine and ununocton. This does not apply to the trivial names these elements receive once confirmed; thus, elements 117 and 118 are now tennessine and oganesson, respectively. For these trivial names, all elements receive the suffix -ium except those in group 17, which receive -ine (like the halogens), and those in group 18, which receive -on (like the noble gases). (That being said, tennessine and oganesson are expected to behave quite differently from their lighter congeners.)

The systematic symbol is formed by taking the first letter of each root, converting the first to a capital. This results in three-letter symbols instead of the one- or two-letter symbols used for named elements. The rationale is that any scheme producing two-letter symbols will have to deviate from full systematicity to avoid collisions with the symbols of the permanently named elements.

The Recommendations for the Naming of Elements of Atomic Numbers Greater than 100 can be found here.

, all 118 discovered elements have received individual permanent names and symbols. Therefore, systematic names and symbols are now used only for the undiscovered elements beyond element 118, oganesson. When such an element is discovered, it will keep its systematic name and symbol until its discovery meets the criteria of and is accepted by the IUPAC/IUPAP Joint Working Party, upon which the discoverers are invited to propose a permanent name and symbol. Once this name and symbol is proposed, there is still a comment period before they become official and replace the systematic name and symbol.

At the time the systematic names were recommended (1978), names had already been officially given to all elements up to atomic number 103, lawrencium. While systematic names were given for elements 101 (mendelevium), 102 (nobelium), and 103 (lawrencium), these were only as "minor alternatives to the trivial names already approved by IUPAC". The following elements for some time only had systematic names as approved names, until their final replacement with trivial names after their discoveries were accepted.

References

External links 

Naming of chemical elements
Chemical nomenclature
Periodic table